Sergiy Kolos is a paralympic athlete from Ukraine competing mainly in category F35 throwing events.

Sergiy has competed at two Paralympics, firstly in 2000 Summer Paralympics where he competed in the discus and shot as well as winning a silver medal in the Javelin.  His second games came in 2004 Summer Paralympics where he competed in the discus and javelin but was unable to add to his medal tally.

References

Paralympic athletes of Ukraine
Athletes (track and field) at the 2000 Summer Paralympics
Athletes (track and field) at the 2004 Summer Paralympics
Paralympic silver medalists for Ukraine
Medalists at the 2000 Summer Paralympics
Living people
Year of birth missing (living people)
Paralympic medalists in athletics (track and field)
Ukrainian male javelin throwers
21st-century Ukrainian people